Wayne Adams, CM ONS (born 1943) is a Canadian former provincial politician who was the first Black Canadian member of the Nova Scotia House of Assembly and cabinet minister.

Early life
Adams was born in Halifax, Nova Scotia in 1943.

Political career
Adams was first elected to the Halifax Municipal Council in 1979 and was re-elected five times. He was deputy mayor from 1982 to 1983.

A Nova Scotia Liberal, he was elected in the 1993 Nova Scotia general election in the riding of Preston. He was the Minister of the Environment, Minister responsible for the Emergency Measures Act, and the Minister responsible for the Nova Scotia Boxing Authority in the governments of first John Savage (1993–1997) and then Russell MacLellan (1997–1998). He was defeated in 1998 by the NDP candidate, Yvonne Atwell.

Electoral record

Awards and recognition
In 2003, he was made a Member of the Order of Canada, Canada's highest civilian honour.

In 2011, he was invested as a member of the Order of Nova Scotia.

References

External links 
 CBC Radio archives: Nova Scotia elects its first black MLA

1943 births
Living people
Black Canadian politicians
Black Nova Scotians
Canadian Baptists
Members of the Executive Council of Nova Scotia
Members of the Order of Canada
Members of the Order of Nova Scotia
Nova Scotia Liberal Party MLAs
People from Halifax, Nova Scotia
Nova Scotia municipal councillors